

A
Marger Apsit

B
George Barna,
Nate Barragar,
Al Bedner,
Bull Behman,
Eddie Bollinger,
Bob Books,
Arda Bowser,
Johnny Budd,
Earl Britton,
Woody Bruder,
Justin Brumbaugh,
Stan Burnham,

C
Tom Capps,
Joe Carpe,
Charlie Cartin,
Guy Chamberlin,
Potsy Clarke,
Alex Clement,
Rudy Comstock,
Babe Connaughton,
Larry Conover,
Chris Cortemeglia,
Clark Craig,
Rae Crowther,
Saville Crowther

D
Russ Daugherty,
Carl Davis,
Harry Dayhoff,
Wally Diehl,
E.A. Dobrey,
Bill Donohue,
Leo Douglass,
Eddie Doyle

E
Chief Elkins,
Jack Ernst
Sidney Eisenberg

F
Jack Filak,
Jack Finn,
Paul Fitzgibbon,
Bob Fitzke,
Bill Fleckenstein,
Adrian Ford

G
Fred Graham,
George Gibson,
Mike Gulian,
Cecil Grigg

H
Eddie Halicki,
Tex Hamer,
Art Harms,
Charlie Havens,
Les Haws,
Bill Hoffman,
Paul Hogan,
Two-Bits Homan,
Jack Hutton

J
Ted James,
Bob Jamieson,
Walt Jean,
Herb Joesting,
Ben Jones

K
Mort Kaer,
Chuck Kassel,
Jake Kauffman,
Bill Kellogg,
Bill Kelly,
Art Koeninger,
Marty Kostos,
Tony Kostos

L
Tom Leary,
Joseph Lightner,
Harvey Long,
Bulger Lowe,
Jerry Lunz,
William R. Lyman

M
Al Maglisceau,
Jimmy Magner,
Walter Mahan,
Roger Mahoney,
Harry Malcolm,
Cliff Marker,
Joey Maxwell,
Jack McArthur,
Elmer McCormick,
Mickey MacDonnell,
Frank McGrath,
Ken Mercer,
Warner Mizell,
Lou Molinet,
Sully Montgomery,
Hap Moran,
Dick Moynihan

N
Mally Nydahl

O
Milt O'Connell,
Arnie Oehlrich

P
Tony Panaccion,
Jim Pederson,
Art Pharmer,
Bob Potts

R
Frank Racis,
Max Reed,
Neil Rengel,
Peter Richards,
Ray Richards,
Carroll Ringwalt,
Wooky Roberts,
Johnny Roepke,
Charley Rogers,
Nicklos Theodore Roush, Sr

S
Herman Seborg,
Walt Sechrist,
Harry Seidelson,
Johnny Shultz,
Joe Spagna,
Bill Springsteen,
Herb Stein,
Russ Stein,
Hust Stockton,
Jack Storer,
George Sullivan, William (Skip) Shinners

T
Charles Tackwell,
Bob Tanner,
Whitey Thomas,
Johnny Thompson,
George Tully

V
Clyde Van Sickle

W
Carl Waite,
Charley Way,
Ed Weir,
Joe Weir,
Bub Weller,
Jim Welsh,
Ned Wilcox,
Frank Wilsbach,
 George Bowman Wilson,
Lee Wilson,
Ab Wright

Y
Swede Youngstrom

 
F